The 1945 Copa Escobar-Gerona, also named Copa de Confraternidad Rioplatense, was the third edition of the competition organised jointly by the Argentine and Uruguayan associations. The 1945 edition marked the first time that the title was actually awarded.

Boca Juniors (Argentine Primera División runner-up) faced Club Nacional de Football (Uruguayan Primera División runner-up) in a two-legged series at San Lorenzo Stadium in Buenos Aires, Argentina and Estadio Centenario in Montevideo, Uruguay. In the first match, Nacional won 2–1, while Boca Juniors won the second match, winning 3–2. After both teams tied on points and no third match was scheduled to define the series, both teams were declared champions and the title was shared.

Qualified teams 

Note

Venues

Match details

First leg 

|

|}

Second leg 

|

|}

References

e
e
1945 in Argentine football
1945 in Uruguayan football
Football in Buenos Aires
Football in Montevideo